David Keith Williamson AO (born 24 February 1942) is an Australian dramatist and playwright. He has also written screenplays and teleplays.

Early life
David Williamson was born in Melbourne, Victoria, on 24 February 1942, and was brought up in Bairnsdale. He initially studied mechanical engineering at the University of Melbourne from 1960, but left and graduated from Monash University with a Bachelor of Engineering degree in 1965. His early forays into the theatre were as an actor and writer of skits for the Engineers' Revue at Melbourne University's Union Theatre at lunchtime during the early 1960s, and as a satirical sketch writer for Monash University student reviews and the Emerald Hill Theatre Company.

After a brief stint as design engineer for GM Holden, Williamson became a lecturer in mechanical engineering and thermodynamics at Swinburne University of Technology (then Swinburne Technical College) in 1966 while studying social psychology as a postgraduate part-time at the University of Melbourne. He completed a Master of Arts in Psychology in 1970, and then completed postgraduate research in social psychology. Williamson later lectured in social psychology at Swinburne, where he remained until 1972.

Career
Williamson first turned to writing and performing in plays in 1967 with La Mama Theatre Company and The Pram Factory, and rose to prominence in the early 1970s, with works such as Don's Party (later turned into a 1976 film), a comic drama set during the 1969 federal election; and The Removalists (1971). He also collaborated on the screenplays for Gallipoli (1981) and The Year of Living Dangerously (1982). Williamson's work as a playwright focuses on themes of politics, loyalty and family in contemporary urban Australia, particularly in two of its major cities, Melbourne and Sydney.

Major stage works include The Club, The Department, Travelling North, The Perfectionist, Emerald City, Money and Friends and Brilliant Lies.

Recent work has included Dead White Males, a satirical approach to postmodernism and university ethics; Up for Grabs, which starred Madonna in its London premiere; and the Jack Manning Trilogy (Face To Face, Conversation, Charitable Intent) which take as their format community conferencing, a new form of restorative justice, in which Williamson became interested in the late 1990s and early 2000s.

In recent years he has alternated work between larger stages (including Soul Mates, Amigos and Influence – all premiered with the Sydney Theatre Company) and smaller ones (including the Manning trilogy, Flatfoot and Operator, which premiered at the Ensemble Theatre).

In 2005, he announced his retirement from main-stage productions, although he has continued to write new plays for the mainstage, many produced with the Ensemble Theatre. He had a serious health problem, cardiac arrhythmia, which had required frequent hospitalisation. An operation resolved this issue, but then in 2009 he had a mild stroke, from which he recovered fully.

Williamson was instrumental in the founding of the Noosa Long Weekend Festival, a cultural festival in Noosa, Queensland, where he lives.

In August 2006 Cate Molloy, former Australian Labor Party member of the Queensland Parliament for Noosa, announced that Williamson would be her campaign manager as she sought to recontest her seat as an Independent.

In 2007 appeared Lotte's Gift, a one-woman show starring Karin Schaupp, which traced a journey through Schaupp's own life as well as those of her mother and grandmother (the Lotte of the title).

In 2021 his memoir, Home Truths, was published by HarperCollins. Reviewing the book for The Sydney Morning Herald, Peter Craven wrote "He comes across as a likeable, flawed fellow with no more blindness than people of lesser talent".

Personal life
Williamson is married to Kristin Williamson (sister of independent filmmaker Chris Löfvén) who have homes in Sydney and on Queensland's Sunshine Coast. They have five adult children and 11 grandchildren. His stepson Felix Williamson and his son Rory Williamson are both actors. Rory starred as Stork in the 2001 revival of The Coming of Stork at the Stables Theatre in Sydney, produced by Felix's company, the Bare Naked Theatre Company.

Honours and awards
 1971 – British George Devine Award
 1972 – Australian Writers Guild Awgie Award for best stage play and best script with The Removalists
 1983 – appointed an Officer of the Order of Australia
 1988 – Honorary Doctor of Letters, University of Sydney
 1990 – Honorary Doctor of Letters, Monash University
 1995 – Human Rights and Equal Opportunity Commission Drama Award for Sanctuary 
 1996 – chosen to deliver the inaugural Andrew Olle Media Lecture
 1996 – Honorary Doctor of Letters, Swinburne University of Technology
 2004 – Honorary Doctor of Letters, University of Queensland
 2012 – Nominated Senior Australian of the Year

Australian Film Institute Awards
 1977 – AFI Award, Best Screenplay, Original or Adapted, Don's Party
 1981 – AFI Award, Best Screenplay, Original or Adapted, Gallipoli
 1987 – AFI Award, Best Screenplay, Adapted, Travelling North
 2009 – AFI Award, Best Screenplay, Adapted, Balibo (shared with director Robert Connolly)

Helpmann Awards
The Helpmann Awards is an awards show, celebrating live entertainment and performing arts in Australia, presented by industry group Live Performance Australia (LPA) since 2001. In 2005, Williamson received the JC Williamson Award, the LPA's highest honour, for their life's work in live performance.

|-
| 2005 || Himself || JC Williamson Award || 
|-

Writings

Plays

The Indecent Exposure of Anthony East (1968)
You've Got to Get on Jack (1970)
The Coming of Stork (1970)
The Removalists (1971)
Don's Party (1971)
Jugglers Three (1972)
What If You Died Tomorrow? (1973)
The Department (1975)
A Handful of Friends (1976)
The Club (1977)
Travelling North (1979)
Celluloid Heroes (1980)
The Perfectionist (1982)
Sons of Cain (1985)
Emerald City (1987)
Top Silk (1989)
Siren (1990)
Money and Friends (1991)
Brilliant Lies (1993)
Sanctuary (1994)
Dead White Males (1995)
Heretic (1996)
Third World Blues (1997, adaptation of Jugglers Three)
After The Ball (1997)
Corporate Vibes (1999)
Face to Face (2000)
The Great Man (2000)
Up for Grabs (2001)
A Conversation (2001)
Charitable Intent (2001)
Soulmates (2002)
Flatfoot (2003)
Birthrights (2003)
Amigos (2004)
Operator (2005)
Influence (2005)
Lotte's Gift (2007) – also known as Strings Under My Fingers
Scarlett O'Hara at the Crimson Parrot (2008)
Let the Sunshine (2009)
Don Parties On (2011)
At Any Cost? (2011)
Nothing Personal (2011)
When Dad Married Fury (2011)
Managing Carmen (2012)
Happiness (2013)
Rupert (2013)
Cruise Control (2014)
Dream Home (2015)
Jack of Hearts (2016)
Credentials (2017)
Sorting Out Rachel (2018)
Nearer the Gods (2018)
The Big Time (2019)
Family Values (2020)
Crunch Time (2020)

Screenplays

Stork (1971) – based on his play
Libido (1972) – segment "The Family Man"
Petersen (1974)
The Removalists (1975) – based on his play
Eliza Fraser (1975)
Don's Party (1976) – based on his play
The Department (1980) (TV movie) – based on his play
The Club (1980) – based on his play
Gallipoli (1981)
Duet for Four (1982)
The Year of Living Dangerously (1983)
Phar Lap (1983)
The Last Bastion (1984) (TV series) – also produced
The Perfectionist (1987) (TV movie) – based on his play
Emerald City (1987) – based on his play
Touch the Sun: Princess Kate (1988) (TV)
A Dangerous Life (1988) (TV mini-series)
The Four Minute Mile (1988)
Sanctuary (1995) – based on his play
Brilliant Lies (1996) – based on his play
Dog's Head Bay (1999) (TV series) – 13 episodes
On the Beach (2000) (TV series)
Balibo (2009)
Face to Face (2011) – based on his play

References

External links 
 
 

David Williamson playscripts, Australian Script Centre

1942 births
20th-century Australian dramatists and playwrights
20th-century Australian male writers
20th-century Australian non-fiction writers
20th-century Australian screenwriters
20th-century essayists
21st-century Australian dramatists and playwrights
21st-century Australian male writers
21st-century Australian non-fiction writers
21st-century Australian screenwriters
21st-century essayists
21st-century memoirists
Acting theorists
Australian essayists
Australian historical fiction writers
Australian male dramatists and playwrights
Australian male non-fiction writers
Australian male screenwriters
Australian memoirists
Australian satirists
Australian social commentators
Australian television writers
Critics of postmodernism
Helpmann Award winners
Lecturers
Living people
Monash University alumni
Officers of the Order of Australia
People educated at University High School, Melbourne
People from Bairnsdale
Australian psychological fiction writers
Academic staff of Swinburne University of Technology
Theatre theorists
Theatrologists
Writers about activism and social change
Writers about theatre
Writers from Melbourne
Writers of historical fiction set in the Middle Ages
Writers of historical fiction set in the modern age